(S)-3,5-Dihydroxyphenylglycine or DHPG is a potent agonist of group I metabotropic glutamate receptors (mGluRs) mGluR1 and mGluR5.

DHPG was the first agonist shown to be selective for group I mGluRs. Agonist activity is found in only the (S)-isomer, and (S)-DHPG may be a partial agonist of group I mGluRs.

(S)-DHPG has been investigated for therapeutic effects in the treatment of neuronal injury (such as those associated with ischemia or hypoxia), cognitive enhancement, and Alzheimer's disease.

3,5-Dihydroxyphenylglycine can be isolated from the latex of Euphorbia helioscopia.

DHGP is also found in vancomycin and related glycopeptides. Although the (S) stereoisomer is synthesized by the DpgA-D enzymes, it is the (R) stereoisomer that is used in vancomycin and other related compounds. DHPG is enzymatically derived from the polyketide synthase pathway.

Biosynthesis 
When synthesized in bacteria, DHPG requires 5 enzymes, DpgA-D and 4-hydroxyphenylglycine transferase (Pgat), in order to be synthesized. DpgA is a type III polyketide synthase and initiates the synthesis by condensing acetyl-CoA with three molecules of malonyl-CoA. The tetra-carbonyl compound then cyclizes to form a C8 intermediate. DpgB/D then dehydrates the intermediate using enolate chemistry to promote the loss of water. DpgB/D isomerizes the product to aromatize the ring.

DpgC oxidizes the aromatic intermediate at the benzylic carbon using oxygen to an alpha-keto compound. DpgC performs this oxidation in absence of any iron, heme, flavin, or pterin cofactors. Chen et al suggest the following reaction mechanism to explain the reactivity of DpgC. This mechanism is supported by findings reported in Widboom et al in 2007. Finally, the molecule is transaminated by 4-hydroxyphenylglycine transferase using tyrosine to become DHPG.

4-Hydroxyphenylglycine transferase synthesizes the (S) stereoisomer of DHPG, however, an epimerase switches the stereocenter to the (R) configuration after DHPG is incorporated into the vancomycin non-ribosomal polypeptide.

References

Amino acid derivatives
Nootropics
Resorcinols
MGlu1 receptor agonists
MGlu5 receptor agonists
Non-proteinogenic amino acids